Seaton is a large village and civil parish in the Allerdale borough of Cumbria, England. Historically part of Cumberland, near the Lake District National Park in England. It is home to around 5,000 people and is one of the largest villages in England. The population of the parish was measured in the 2011 Census as 5,022. Historically a part of Cumberland, it is situated on the north side of the River Derwent, across from the town of Workington, and close to the smaller village of Camerton. Seaton forms part of the Borough of Allerdale.

Etymology
The name Seaton is believed to originate from the Old English name 'Sǣtūn'. where 'tūn' means 'homestead' or 'village', and 'sǣ' simply means 'sea'. However, since Seaton is over a mile away from the sea, this interpretation of the name is not certain.

History
The earliest evidence of habitation in and around Seaton are the so-called 'Burrow Walls' less than a mile west of the village. These walls are the remains of a medieval manor house, itself built within the remains of a Roman fort believed to be called 'Magis'. It is believed the fort was built between 79 and 122 to guard the coast against attacks by the Scoti from Ireland and the Caledonii from Scotland.

Around 1100 the manor of Seaton was granted to a man named Orme on his marriage to Gunhild, sister of Waltheof, Lord of Allerdale and daughter of Gospatric, Earl of Northumbria. Orme's manor house was built on the same site as the old Roman fort, although a descendant, Patrick Culwen de Workington, pulled the house down and moved the family south across the river to Workington Hall. They would later adopt the surname Curwen, and generally used the title Lord of Workington, first obtained by Gospatric, son of Orme.

Traditionally, Seaton's economy was based on farming and mining. In 1762 Seaton Iron Works was established on the north bank of the River Derwent below the village at Barepot. It was a major concern at one time, employing hundreds of people, before its blast furnace ceased operation in 1857. The structures were demolished and there is very little trace remaining of the iron works today. The village experienced a large population increase during the 1800s caused by the boom of nearby Workington's steel industry. Workington's steel industry is now much smaller, and Seaton has become a dormitory settlement for other West Coast industries.

On 7 April 1964 Seaton was the site of the murder of John Alan West which led to the two final executions in the United Kingdom.

Governance
The village is in the parliamentary constituency of Workington. In the December 2019 general election, the Tory candidate for Workington, Mark Jenkinson, was elected the MP, overturning a 9.4 per cent Labour majority from the 2017 election to eject shadow environment secretary Sue Hayman by a margin of 4,136 votes. Until the December 2019 general election, the Labour Party had won the seat in every general election since 1979. The Conservative Party had only been elected once in Workington since World War II, at the 1976 by-election. Historically Seaton has been a Labour supporting area.

Before Brexit for  the European Parliament residents in Seaton voted to elect MEP's for the North West England constituency.

For Local Government purposes it is in the Seaton + Northside Ward of Allerdale Borough Council and the Seaton Division of Cumbria County Council.

Seaton has its own Parish Council; Seaton Parish Council.

Notable people
Mark Jenkinson, Conservative politician and Member of Parliament (MP) for Workington since 2019.

Amenities
Amenities include: some small local shops, One Stop, a petrol station, two schools – Seaton Academy (formerly Infant School), and Seaton Junior Church of England school, a library, three pubs, a local Rugby league team, Seaton Rangersand a Nursery, Happy Hours.

Transport
Seaton used to have a railway station on the Cleator and Workington Junction Railway, the station closed in 1922.

See also

Listed buildings in Seaton, Cumbria

References

External links

  Cumbria County History Trust: Seaton (nb: provisional research only – see Talk page)

 
Villages in Cumbria
Civil parishes in Cumbria
Allerdale
Roman sites in Cumbria